Bishop Chatard High School is a Catholic co-educational preparatory high school located in the Broad Ripple district of Indianapolis, Indiana in the United States. It is named after Bishop Silas Chatard, who was the first Bishop of Indianapolis, and oversaw the movement of the diocese from Vincennes to Indianapolis in 1898.

School history

The increase in Indiana's Catholic population that triggered the splitting of the Indianapolis diocese in 1944 also caused an increase in the need for Catholic schools. It was clear that one high school would not be sufficient to provide for Indianapolis' massively expanding Catholic population. To this end, the Archbishop of Indianapolis, Paul Clarence Schulte, ordered the construction of three new Catholic high schools in the city. The first of these, Bishop Chatard, would serve the north side of Indianapolis. The two other new schools, Roncalli High School and Cardinal Ritter High School, would serve the south and west sides of Indianapolis respectively. Scecina would continue to serve the east side of the city.

Ground was broken for the first of the schools, Bishop Chatard, in the fall of 1960 on diocese property at the corner of Crittenden and Kessler Avenues. Construction of the school and an adjacent convent was completed in less than a year, and the first students were admitted in September 1961. Each year a class of students was added to the school, and the first graduating class was the class of 1964-65.

Initially, classes were taught almost entirely by priests from the Archdiocese of Indianapolis and Benedictine Sisters of Beech Grove. Many sisters were housed in the convent on-site, but their numbers declined to the point that in the 1970s, their convent was converted to an annex of the school. The annex has served as classroom, office and storage space for thirty years, and was recently rededicated to the Sisters as the St. Benedict Center.

By 1997, the school was showing its age. Paint was peeling, windows and roofs were leaky, and facilities sorely needed an upgrade. To remedy the situation and remodel the 35-year-old building, school administrators embarked on a $2 million capital campaign to pay for new windows, a new roof, electrical improvements, and other needed renovations. These were undertaken in summer 1997.

In the summer of 2005, and completed over the 2007-08 school year, a campaign involved the construction of an additional elevator to allow better access to classrooms for handicapped students and a remodeling of the cafeteria and several hallways. A new auxiliary gymnasium was paid for by alumni donations and a slight tuition increase.

Academics
Bishop Chatard has been accredited by AdvancED or its predecessors since April 2004.

Demographics
The demographic breakdown of the 691 students enrolled in 2015-2016 was:

Asian/Pacific islanders - 0.9%
Black - 11.7%
Hispanic - 3.3%
White - 80.6%
Multiracial - 3.5%

Athletics
The Bishop Chatard Trojans compete in the Circle City Conference. School colors are royal blue and white.  The following Indiana High School Athletic Association (IHSAA) sanctioned sports are offered:

Baseball (boys)
Basketball (girls and boys)
Boys state championships - 2003
Cross country (girls and boys)
Football (boys)
State championships - 1983, 1984, 1997, 1998, 2001, 2002, 2003, 2006, 2007, 2010, 2011, 2012, 2015, 2019, 2020, 2022
Golf (girls and boys)
Soccer (girls and boys)
Softball (girls)
Swimming (girls and boys)
Tennis - (girls and boys)
Track - (girls and boys)
Volleyball (girls)
State championships - 2004, 2012
Wrestling (boys)

Student activities
Chatard competes annually in the Brain Game, a quiz bowl program broadcast on local television. There are many fine arts programs, such as marching band, concert band, pep band, concert choir, show choir, and the thespian society.

Notable alumni

Ryan Baker -NFL defensive end
Cap Boso - NFL tight end
Joe Holland - NFL linebacker 
Doug Jones - actor
Bill Lynch - NCAA head football coach 
Nick Martin - NFL offensive center
Zack Martin - NFL offensive guard
Dray Mason - professional indoor football player
Karen Pence - Second Lady of the United States
Maris Valainis - actor
Vincent Ventresca - actor

See also
 List of high schools in Indiana

References

External links

 

Schools in Indianapolis
Catholic secondary schools in Indiana
Private high schools in Indiana
Roman Catholic Archdiocese of Indianapolis
IHSAA Conference-Independent Schools
IUPUI Jaguars men's basketball
Educational institutions established in 1961
1961 establishments in Indiana
Circle City Conference schools